Francis Taylor (30 May 1914 – 15 April 1998) was an Irish Fine Gael politician.

A farmer before entering politics, he was first elected to the Dáil Éireann as a Fine Gael Teachta Dála (TD) for the Clare constituency at the 1969 general election, recapturing the seat held by Fine Gael TD William Murphy, who had died in 1967 and been replaced at the Clare by-election by Fianna Fáil's Sylvester Barrett.

Taylor was re-elected at the 1973 and 1977 general elections. When he retired from Dáil Éireann at the 1981 general election, his daughter Madeleine Taylor-Quinn was elected.

See also
Families in the Oireachtas

References

1914 births
1998 deaths
Fine Gael TDs
Members of the 19th Dáil
Members of the 20th Dáil
Members of the 21st Dáil
Politicians from County Clare
Irish farmers